Nina Hollein (9 February 1971, Vienna) is an Austrian author, architect, and fashion designer based in New York City.

Life 
Hollein, the daughter of a designer and a classical philologist, grew up in Vienna and Linz. Her interest in architecture and design developed at an early age, inspired by her uncles Laurids Ortner and Manfred Ortner of the Austrian architect and artist group Haus-Rucker-Co. After her high school Matura, Hollein studied architecture at the Vienna University of Technology and graduated with a Master of Science degree. In 1996, she received a scholarship from the Austrian Federal Chancellery and moved to New York. While there, she worked in the offices of Peter Eisenman and Tod Williams Billie Tsien Architects. In 2001, she and her husband Max Hollein moved to Frankfurt. In Frankfurt, she joined the office of the architect and urban planner Albert Speer. After the birth of her first child, Hollein worked as a book author and wrote reviews and essays for children's books. In addition, Hollein worked as a writer for the Frankfurter Allgemeine Zeitung and the German lifestyle magazine . In 2009, Hollein founded her own fashion label for women and children. For her first collection, she received the award of the Frankfurt Fashion Fair "Stilblüte".

Books 
 Cut-Out Fun with Matisse, Prestel Verlag München, March 2014
 Yves Klein – Into the Blue (Can You Tell It's Art?), Hatje Cantz Verlag Berlin, published in September 2004

Exhibitions 
 "Palindrome" – Kunstverein Familie Montez (Frankfurt): in collaboration with Hollein's brother Philipp Schweiger, July to August 2021

Personal life 
Hollein is married to curator and museum director Max Hollein. They have three children and currently live in New York City.

External links 
 Official website

References 

1971 births
Living people
Austrian architects
Austrian women architects
Austrian fashion designers
Austrian women fashion designers
Writers from Vienna
Architects from Vienna
21st-century Austrian writers
21st-century Austrian women writers